Prime circle may refer to:
 Prime Circle, South African rock band
Prime circle (engineering)

See also